Calamotropha is a genus of moths of the family Crambidae.

Species

Calamotropha abjectella Snellen, 1872
Calamotropha abrupta W. Li & H. Li, 2012
Calamotropha aeneiciliellus (de Joannis, 1930)
Calamotropha aequilata W. Li & H. Li, 2012
Calamotropha afra Bassi, 1986
Calamotropha agryppina Błeszyński, 1961
Calamotropha albistrigellus (Hampson, 1896)
Calamotropha alcesta Błeszyński, 1961
Calamotropha anticella (Walker, 1866) (from Sri Lanka)
Calamotropha arachnophagus (Strand, 1918)
Calamotropha argenteociliella Pagenstecher, 1893
Calamotropha argenticilia (Hampson, 1896) (from Sri Lanka)
Calamotropha argyrostola (Hampson, 1919)
Calamotropha athena Błeszyński, 1961
Calamotropha atkinsoni Zeller, 1863 (from Sri Lanka)
Calamotropha aureliellus (Fischer von Röslerstamm, 1841)
Calamotropha azumai Błeszyński, 1960
Calamotropha baibarellus (Shibuya, 1928)
Calamotropha bicepellum Song in Song, Wang & Wu, 2002
Calamotropha bicornutella Błeszyński, 1961
Calamotropha boninellus (Shibuya, 1929)
Calamotropha bradleyi Błeszyński, 1960
Calamotropha brevilinellus (South in Leech & South, 1901)
Calamotropha brevistrigellus (Caradja, 1932)
Calamotropha caesella (Walker, 1863)
Calamotropha camilla Błeszyński, 1966
Calamotropha cleopatra Błeszyński, 1961
Calamotropha corticellus (Hampson, 1899)
Calamotropha dagamae Bassi in Bassi & Trematerra, 2014
Calamotropha danutae Błeszyński, 1961
Calamotropha delatalis (Walker, 1863)
Calamotropha dentatella Song & Chen in Chen, Song & Yuan, 2002
Calamotropha diakonoffi Błeszyński, 1961
Calamotropha dielota Meyrick, 1886
Calamotropha diodonta (Hampson, 1919)
Calamotropha discellus (Walker, 1863)
Calamotropha doii Sasaki, 1997
Calamotropha duofurcata W. Li & H. Li, 2012
Calamotropha endopolia Hampson, 1912
Calamotropha euphrosyne Błeszyński, 1966
Calamotropha formosella Błeszyński, 1961
Calamotropha franki (Caradja, 1931)
Calamotropha fulvifusalis (Hampson, 1900)
Calamotropha fuscacostalis Maes, 2012
Calamotropha fuscilineatellus (D. Lucas, 1938)
Calamotropha fuscivittalis (Hampson, 1910)
Calamotropha haplorus (Turner, 1911)
Calamotropha heliocaustus (Wallengren, 1876)
Calamotropha hierichuntica Zeller, 1867
Calamotropha indica Błeszyński, 1961
Calamotropha janusella Błeszyński, 1961
Calamotropha javaica Błeszyński, 1961
Calamotropha josettae Błeszyński, 1961
Calamotropha joskeaella Błeszyński, 1961
Calamotropha kuchleini Błeszyński, 1961
Calamotropha kurenzovi Kirpichnikova, 1982
Calamotropha latellus (Snellen, 1890)
Calamotropha lattini Błeszyński, 1961
Calamotropha lempkei Schouten, 1993
Calamotropha leptogrammellus (Meyrick, 1879)
Calamotropha lupatus (Meyrick, 1932)
Calamotropha malgasella Błeszyński, 1970
Calamotropha martini Błeszyński, 1961
Calamotropha megalopunctata Błeszyński, 1961
Calamotropha melanosticta (Hampson, 1896)
Calamotropha melli (Caradja & Meyrick, 1933)
Calamotropha mesostrigalis (Hampson, 1919)
Calamotropha mimosa Błeszyński, 1961
Calamotropha multicornuella Song & Chen in Chen, Song & Yuan, 2002
Calamotropha neurigrammalis (Hampson, 1912)
Calamotropha nigripunctellus (Leech, 1889)
Calamotropha niveicostellus (Hampson, 1919)
Calamotropha obliterans (Walker, 1863)
Calamotropha oculalis (Snellen, 1893)
Calamotropha okanoi Błeszyński, 1961
Calamotropha paludella (Hübner, 1824)
Calamotropha papuella Błeszyński, 1966
Calamotropha psaltrias (Meyrick, 1933)
Calamotropha pseudodielota Błeszyński, 1961
Calamotropha punctivenellus (Hampson, 1896)
Calamotropha robustella Snellen, 1872
Calamotropha saturnella Błeszyński, 1961
Calamotropha sawtoothella Song & Chen in Chen, Song & Yuan, 2002
Calamotropha schoennmanni Błeszyński, 1961
Calamotropha schwarzi Błeszyński, 1961
Calamotropha shichito (Marumo, 1931)
Calamotropha sienkiewiczi Błeszyński, 1961
Calamotropha snelleni Schouten, 1993
Calamotropha stachi Błeszyński, 1961
Calamotropha subalcesta Błeszyński, 1961
Calamotropha subdiodonta Błeszyński, 1961
Calamotropha subterminellus (Wileman & South, 1917)
Calamotropha sumatraella Błeszyński, 1961
Calamotropha sybilla Błeszyński, 1966
Calamotropha tonsalis (Walker, 1863)
Calamotropha toonderi Schouten, 1993
Calamotropha torpidellus (Zeller, 1852)
Calamotropha toxophorus (de Joannis, 1927)
Calamotropha tripartitus (Hampson, 1919)
Calamotropha unicolorellus (Zeller, 1863)
Calamotropha unispinea W. Li & H. Li, 2012
Calamotropha venera Błeszyński, 1961
Calamotropha virginiae Bassi in Bassi & Trematerra, 2014
Calamotropha virra Błeszyński, 1966
Calamotropha wallengreni Błeszyński, 1961
Calamotropha xantholeuca (Meyrick, 1933)
Calamotropha xanthypa Błeszyński, 1961
Calamotropha yamanakai Inoue, 1958
Calamotropha zoma Viette, 1971

References

 , 1986: Contributo allo studio delle Crambinae (Lepidoptera, Pyralidae). II: Nuove specie africane. Bollettino del Museo Regionale di Scienze Naturali Torino 4 (2): 537–541.
 , 1970: A revision of the Oriental species of the genus Ancylolomia Hübner (Studies on the Crambinae, Lepidoptera Pyralidae part 49). Tijdschrift voor Entomologie 113 (1): 27-43.
 , 2002: A Review of the Chinese Calamotropha Zeller (Lepidoptera: Pyralidae: Crambinae), with descriptions of three new species. Oriental Insects 36 (1): 35-46. Abstract: .
 , 2012: Review of the genus Calamotropha Zeller (Lepidoptera: Crambidae: Crambinae) from China, with descriptions of four new species. Journal of Natural History 43-44: 2639-2664. Abstract: .
 , 2011: New Crambidae from the Afrotropical region (Lepidoptera: Pyraloidea: Crambidae). Lambillionea 111 (3) Tome 1: 241-248.
 , 1959, Notes on some Japanese Crambinae (Pyralidae) 1. Tyô to Ga 10 (4): 50-51. Abstract and full article: Notes on some Japanese Crambinae (Pyralididae) (1).
 , 1960: Notes on some Japanese Crambinae (Pyralidae) 2. Tyô to Ga 11 (1): 8-11. Abstract and full article: Notes on some Japanese Crambinae (Pyralididae) (2).

Crambinae
Crambidae genera
Taxa named by Philipp Christoph Zeller